Vosmer's writhing skink (Riopa vosmaeri) is a species of skink, a lizard in the family Scincidae. The species is endemic to India.

Etymology
The specific name, vosmaeri, is in honor of Dutch naturalist Arnout Vosmaer (1720–1799).

Geographic range and habitat
R. vosmaerii is found in India. Originally it was known only from the holotype. A second specimen was discovered in 2009 in an open scrub jungle in rocky habitat near Jaggayapet, Andhra Pradesh, some 170 years after the collection of the holotype.

Description
R. vosmaerii resembles L. lineata. However, L. vosmaerii has five digits on each front foot, where R. lineata has only four.

References

Further reading
Boulenger GA (1887). Catalogue of the Lizards in the British Museum (Natural History). Second Edition. Volume III. Lacertidæ, Gerrhosauridæ, Scincidæ, Anelytropidæ, Dibamidæ, Chamæleontidæ. London: Trustees of the British Museum (Natural History). (Taylor and Francis, printers). xii + 575 pp. + Plates I-XL. (Lygosoma vosmaeri, p. 315 + Plate XXV, figures 2, 2a, 2b).
Smith MA (1935). The Fauna of British India, Including Ceylon and Burma. Reptilia and Amphibia. Vol. II.—Sauria. London: Secretary of State for India in Council. (Taylor and Francis, printers). xiii + 440 pp. + Plate I + 2 maps. (Riopa vosmaeri, p. 322).
Vyas, Raju (2002). "Notes on the distribution of Lygosoma lineata (Gray, 1839) and comments on the systematic status of L. vosmaerii (Gray, 1839)". Hamadryad 26 (2):360-361. [2001].

External links
Banglapedia, National Encyclopedia of Bangladesh (http://en.banglapedia.org/index.php?title=Lizard).

Riopa
Reptiles of India
Endemic fauna of India
Reptiles described in 1839
Taxa named by John Edward Gray
Taxobox binomials not recognized by IUCN